The Yeongnam Alps are a outlying range of the Taebaek Mountains. They consist of a group of relatively tall mountains in the Yeongnam region of southeastern South Korea.  They are much shorter than the European Alps, only slightly over 1000 m.  The term is sometimes restricted to those peaks exceeding 1000 m in height, but may be informally extended to lower peaks in the same region.

The Yeongnam Alps cover a small region at the meeting of Gyeongsangnam-do, Gyeongsangbuk-do, and Ulsan.  The Gyeongnam side is in Sannae-myeon, Miryang; the Gyeongbuk side is in Unmun-myeon, Cheongdo; and the Ulsan side lies in Sangbuk-myeon, Ulju-gun.

The area is a popular attraction for South Korean domestic tourism.  This is due both to the mountain scenery and to the numerous landmarks in the region.  These include the temples such as Tongdosa and Pyochungsa, the "ice valley" Eoreumgol, various waterfalls and hot springs.

List of peaks

Gajisan, 1241 m
Cheonhwangsan (also called Jaeyaksan), 1189 m
Unmunsan, 1188 m
Sinbulsan, 1159 m
Jaeyaksan, 1119 m
Yeongchuksan (also called Yeongchwisan, Chwiseosan and Chukseosan), 1081 m
Ganwolsan, 1069 m
Goheonsan, 1033 m
Munboksan, 1015 m

See also
List of Korean mountains

External links
Invil profile of selected mountains
Yeongnam Alps Official Homepage operated by Ulsan city and Uljugun county

Mountain ranges of South Korea
Landforms of South Gyeongsang Province
Landforms of North Gyeongsang Province
Mountains of Ulsan
Tourist attractions in Ulsan
Tourist attractions in South Gyeongsang Province
Tourist attractions in North Gyeongsang Province